Hamat Gader (or , ;  , meaning "the Syrian Hamma") is a hot springs site in the Yarmouk River valley, used since the classical antiquity. It is located in an area under Israeli control, in what was a demilitarized zone between Israel and Syria from 1949 to 1967. It is set on several mineral springs with temperatures up to 50 °C.

Etymology
The ancient Hebrew name, Hammat Gader or Hammath Gader, means hot springs of Gader, also translated as Hammath-by-Gadara. The ruins of the ancient city of Gadara stand south of Hammat Gader, on the plateau edge above the springs, in modern Umm Qais.

The Arabic name Al-Hammeh or El-Hamma dates back to the medieval period and also relates to "hot springs". The name of the tell located near the site, Tell Bani, is a corruption of the Latin word meaning "baths".

History

Roman, Byzantine and Umayyad periods
Hamat Gader was already a widely known health and recreation site in Roman times. It is mentioned in Strabo, Origen and Eunapius, as well as the Rabbinic literature of the first centuries CE.

Construction of the bath complex began in the 2nd century by the 10th Roman Legion, which was garrisoned in the city of Gadara. Two distinct construction periods are evident at the site: The Roman-Byzantine Period, during which most of the bath complex was built, and the Muslim period, during which major changes were made to the existing structures.

A large synagogue was built in the 5th century CE. The empress Aelia Eudocia composed a poem praising the qualities of the multiple springs which was inscribed so that visitors could see it as they went into the pool.

Some of the buildings including the famous thermae were damaged by an earthquake and restored in 663 by the first Umayyad caliph Mu'awiyah who ruled from Damascus. A century later the 749 Galilee earthquake hit. Eventually, in the 9th century, the baths were abandoned and a thick layer of silt covered the ruins.

Mandate period
The border between the Mandatory Palestine and the French Mandate for Syria and the Lebanon was drawn in 1923, and Al-Hamma was included in Palestine.

Before 1949, the Palestinian Arab village Al-Hamma was located at this site. At the time of the 1931 census, it had 46 occupied houses and a population of 170 Muslims, 1 Jew and 1 Christian.

Syrian control

After the 1948 Arab–Israeli War, according to the armistice agreements of 1949 Between Israel and Syria, it was determined that the area would be included in the demilitarized zone (DMZ) between Israel and Syria. The villagers and their property were formally protected by Article V of the Israeli-Syrian agreement of 20 July that year. However, Israel thought the Arab villagers could pose a security threat, and Israeli settlers and settlement agencies coveted the land. Israel therefore wanted the Palestinian inhabitants, a total of 2,200 people, moved to Syria.

On April 4, 1951, a two-vehicle military patrol set out for Hamat Gader in order to assert Israeli sovereignty over the site, over the objections from the Northern Command that Syria was likely to attack it. Since military forces were not permitted in the DMZ, members of the patrol were disguised as policemen. As predicted, the Syrians attacked the patrol and seven Israeli soldiers were killed. In retaliation, Israel bombed the Syrian police station at al Hamma and another Syrian position, killing two women, and demolished the empty houses in Kirad al-Ghannama, Kirad al-Baqqara, Al-Samra and Nuqeib in order to render the DMZ "clear of Arabs".

Israeli control
Israeli control over Hamat Gader was secured during the Six-Day War in 1967, when the Israeli army occupied the surrounding Golan Heights, allowing free access to Hamat Gader for Israelis. Since then, it has been under Israeli control and has been developed as a tourist attraction, health resort and an alligator and exotic bird reserve. The health resort opened in 1977.

Today, Hamat Gader also includes a crocodilian farm with crocodiles, alligators and even caimans and gavials. It has about 200 crocodilians and it is the largest crocodile farm in the Middle East.

Tourist site
The Hamat Gader tourist site is centered around thermal baths and a crocodile farm. The water of the thermal baths contains sulfur at a concentration of 4.7%, which may have a therapeutic effect on skin diseases, asthma, rheumatism and wrist pain, as well as renew skin cells.

Further reading
 E.L. Sukenik, The Ancient Synagogue of el-Hammeh, Journal of the Palestine Oriental Society, 1935. pp. 101–ff.

References

External links

Photos of the Hammat Gader baths at the Manar al-Athar photo archive

Hot springs
Springs of Israel
Archaeological sites on the Golan Heights
Populated places in the Golan Heights
Tourist attractions in Northern District (Israel)
Israeli mosaics